Sonia Furstenau is a Canadian politician who is currently the leader of the Green Party of British Columbia.

Furstenau was raised in Edmonton, the child of German immigrants. She attended McKernan Elementary/Junior-High School, where she was in Grade 2 in 1977-78. She went on a trip to Germany with her father, including his native East Germany, where she learned to appreciate the value of democracy by observing the lack of it. She later helped her mother protest against dumping in the vicinity of Elk Island National Park in the early 1990s.

Furstenau attended the University of Victoria starting at age 20, attaining an MA in History and a Bachelor of Education. After teaching in Victoria-area schools, her work took her to Shawnigan Lake in 2011. Here she encountered the dumping of toxic soil close to the water supply, which led her to citizen involvement and to becoming a director of the Cowichan Valley Regional District (see below).

Prior to holding elected office, Furstenau was a high school teacher in Victoria and Shawnigan Lake. She has a BA and MA in History from the University of Victoria.

Political career
Furstenau was elected to the Legislative Assembly of British Columbia in the 2017 provincial election to represent the electoral district of Cowichan Valley. On November 2, 2016, Green Party leader Andrew Weaver announced that Furstenau would replace Adam Olsen as one of the deputy leaders of the party. On January 27, 2020, Furstenau announced her candidacy for the leadership of the party.

In 2014, Furstenau started her political career when she was elected to serve as a director of Electoral Area B within the Cowichan Valley Regional District. This was after two years working with the Shawnigan Resident's Association to protest and appeal a British Columbia Provincial permit that allowed the siting of a landfill on the banks of the community's source of drinking water, Shawnigan Lake.

Electoral record

References

Canadian schoolteachers
Green Party of British Columbia MLAs
Living people
University of Victoria alumni
Women MLAs in British Columbia
21st-century Canadian politicians
21st-century Canadian women politicians
Year of birth missing (living people)
Leaders of the Green Party of British Columbia